Nena Live, released on 16 November 1998, is a live recording by German pop singer Nena. It features a show performed at the Rheinstadion in Düsseldorf on 21 August 1998 (the last track, Pur's "Lena", here rendered as "Nena", was recorded the following evening). This is Nena's second live album and should be distinguished from Nenalive, the 1995 release with a similar title.

Track listing

References

External links
 

Nena albums
1998 live albums
German-language live albums
Polydor Records live albums